Jack E. Bronston (January 10, 1922 – December 7, 2017) was an American lawyer and politician from New York.

Life
He was born in Plainfield, Union County, New Jersey, the son of Harry E. Bronston (1892–1972). He attended Plainfield High School and graduated A.B. from Harvard College in 1942. During World War II he served in the U.S. Marine Corps. He graduated from Harvard Law School in 1948, and received an LL.M. in taxation from New York University School of Law. He was admitted to the bar in 1949, and practiced in New York City. He married Adele Schwartz.

He entered politics as a Democrat, and was a member of the New York State Senate from 1959 to 1978, sitting in the 172nd, 173rd, 174th, 175th, 176th, 177th, 178th, 179th, 180th, 181st and 182nd New York State Legislatures.

On January 2, 1981, he was sentenced by Milton Pollack, of the U.S. District Court for the Southern District of New York, to four months in prison for fraud. Bronston had helped one company to get a contract for New York City bus shelters while having been retained by, and thus legally representing, a competing company. On August 19, 1981, the conviction was upheld by the United States Court of Appeals for the Second Circuit.

On June 18, 1981, Bronston's license to practice law was suspended by the New York Supreme Court, Appellate Division effective July 17. On March 5, 1985, the suspension was declared as terminated, effectively from September 17, 1984.

Sources

1922 births
2017 deaths
Plainfield High School (New Jersey) alumni
Politicians from Plainfield, New Jersey
Democratic Party New York (state) state senators
American politicians convicted of fraud
Harvard Law School alumni
New York University School of Law alumni
People from Queens, New York
United States Marine Corps personnel of World War II